Boga Lake can refer to:
 Lake Boga (Victoria), a lake in Victoria, Australia
 Lake Boga, Victoria, a town located adjacent to the lake
 Lake Boga railway station
 Lake Boga Flying Boat Base
 Lake Boga mission
 A lake, also called Bagakain Lake, in Bangladesh

See also
 Boga (disambiguation)

Disambiguation pages